Francis Leplay is a French actor and writer. An alumnus of France's National Academy of Dramatic Arts and Sciences Po, he began acting on television in episodes of the French detective series Julie Lescaut and Navarro. His first film role was in Laurence Ferreira Barbosa's J'ai horreur de l'amour (I Hate Love) in 1997. His career took off in the 2000s, and he soon started acting in films by directors Sofia Coppola, Noémie Lvovsky, Arnaud Desplechin, and Benoît Jacquot as well as in the TV series Spiral. He has also acted in theater productions with directors Denis Podalydès and Lambert Wilson in venues such as Lincoln Center, the Mossovet Theatre, and the Bouffes du Nord. The Éditions du Seuil published two of his novels, 2006's Après le spectacle, a work of autofiction comparing intermittent acting work and romantic uncertainty, and 2009's Samuel et Alexandre, which follows two men staking out the bounds of their friendship. In 2021, Leplay and French-American filmmaker Isidore Bethel co-directed the docufiction hybrid film Acts of Love, which premiered at Hot Docs.

Filmography

Film, as director

Film, as actor

Television, as actor

Stage

Novels

References 

1967 births
Living people
Jewish French male actors
French Ashkenazi Jews
French people of Polish-Jewish descent
French film directors
French male film actors
French male television actors
20th-century French male actors
21st-century French male actors
French film producers
French male stage actors
Sciences Po alumni
French National Academy of Dramatic Arts alumni
LGBT film directors
LGBT producers